Dange may refer to:

People:
 Dange (surname)

Places:
Dange Shuni, Local Government Area in Sokoto State, Nigeria
Dange-Saint-Romain, commune in the Vienne department in the Poitou-Charentes region in western France
Dange (Uíge province), a place in Uíge province, Angola

Rivers:
The Dange River (now known as the Danė) which has its mouth at Memel (Klaipėda).

See also
Annasaheb Dange College of Engineering & Technology, Ashta in the city of Ashta, Maharashtra, India
Dangeau
Dangha
Dangpa